Starkey may refer to:

Places

United States
 Starkey, New York, a town
 Starkey United Methodist Church, on the National Register of Historic Places
 Starkey, Oregon, an unincorporated community
 Starkey, Virginia, an unincorporated community
 Starkey School, a former school building on the National Register of Historic Places
 Starkey Township, Logan County, North Dakota
 Starkey Wilderness Preserve, a nature preserve in Pasco County, Florida

Canada
 Starkey Hill, the highest point in Puslinch Township, Ontario

Other uses
 Starkey (surname), people with the surname Starkey
 Starkey baronets, a title in the Baronetage of the United Kingdom
 Operation Starkey, a Second World War sham Allied invasion
 Starkey International Institute for Household Management, a school for butlers, in Denver, Colorado, US
 Starkey Hearing Technologies, a hearing aid manufacturer located in Eden Prairie, Minnesota, US

See also 
 Starkie (Scottish spelling)
 Stark (disambiguation)